Lindisfarne is a suburb of Hobart's Eastern Shore, located approximately 6 kilometres from the City Centre and is part of the municipal City of Clarence.

History
The suburb originally took its name from Lindisferne House, (Note: Suburb originally spelt incorrectly), a property built in the 1820s near the suburb of Rosny. At one time the suburb was known as Beltana from 1892, but, because of confusion with Bellerive, it was renamed Lindisfarne in 1903 after Lindisfarne a tidal Island (Holy Island) in Northumberland, England.  The easternmost part of the middle of the suburb, where the Beltana Bowls Club and the Beltana Hotel are located, is still locally known as Beltana.

Lindisfarne Bay and boating
Lindisfarne is centred on a bay of the same name that is one of many such sheltered anchorages on the Derwent River. The bay is home to a number of clubs that cater for rowing, sailing and motor-cruising the local waterways.

The Motor Yacht Club of Tasmania Est. 1924 in Lindisfarne Bay (pictured), The Lindisfarne Sailing Club Est. 1955 and the Lindisfarne Rowing Club Est. 1905 (the club of rowers Scott Brennan and Stephen Hawkins) are all situated on the bay's foreshore.

Sports
Lindisfarne has a large recreation park which includes playing fields—home to the Lindisfarne Blues competing in the Southern Tasmanian Football League now known as the SFL and the Lindisfarne Cricket Club competing in the Tasmanian Grade Cricket part of the Tasmanian Cricket Association, tennis courts—home to the Lindisfarne Tennis Club, Beltana RSL Bowls Club links and an ANZAC memorial park, all situated on a bluff overlooking the Derwent River and Mount Wellington.  The memorial park is also the site of a large Tasmanian Aboriginal midden.

Retirement villages
Lindisfarne is also home to a number of large retirement villages and similar senior-citizen accommodations. Including the Queen Victoria Home and the Freemasons Home Southern Tasmania.

Christian links
Some Christian Church institutions in Lindisfarne take their names from the saints and scholars of the English Lindisfarne, such as St Aidan's Anglican Church and St Cuthbert's Catholic Primary School.

Education
Schools in Lindisfarne include St Cuthbert's Catholic Primary School and Lindisfarne State Primary School.

References

External links
 Australian National Place Names page 10 December 2004 Crisis in Identity retrieved June 2009

Localities of City of Clarence